Mark Richard Shuttleworth (born 18 September 1973) is a South African and British entrepreneur who is the founder and CEO of Canonical, the company behind the development of the Linux-based Ubuntu operating system. In 2002, Shuttleworth became the first South African to travel to space as a space tourist, and the first African from an independent country to travel to space. He lives on the Isle of Man and holds dual citizenship from South Africa and the United Kingdom. According to the Sunday Times Rich List in 2020, Shuttleworth is worth an estimated £500 million.

Early life
Shuttleworth was born in Welkom, Free State, South Africa, to a surgeon and a nursery-school teacher, Shuttleworth attended school at Western Province Preparatory School (where he eventually became Head Boy in 1986), followed by one term at Rondebosch Boys' High School, and then at Bishops/Diocesan College, where he was Head Boy in 1991. Shuttleworth obtained a Bachelor of Business Science degree in Finance and Information Systems at the University of Cape Town. As a student, he became involved in the installation of the first residential Internet connections at the university.

Work
In 1995, Shuttleworth founded Thawte Consulting, a company which specialized in digital certificates and Internet security. In December 1999, Shuttleworth sold Thawte to VeriSign, earning Shuttleworth R3.5 billion ( million, equivalent to $ million in ).

In September 2000, Shuttleworth formed HBD Venture Capital (Here be Dragons), a business incubator and venture capital provider now managed by Knife Capital. In March 2004 he formed Canonical Ltd., for the promotion and commercial support of free software projects, especially the Ubuntu operating system. In December 2009, Shuttleworth stepped down as the CEO of Canonical Ltd, Jane Silber took Canonical CEO position. Shuttleworth resumed the position of CEO of Canonical in July 2017 at the end of Silber's tenure.

Linux and FOSS

In the 1990s, Shuttleworth participated as one of the developers of the Debian operating system.

In 2001, he formed the Shuttleworth Foundation, a nonprofit organisation dedicated to social innovation which also funds educational, free, and open source software projects in South Africa, such as the Freedom Toaster.

In 2004, he returned to the free-software world by funding the development of Ubuntu, a Linux distribution based on Debian, through his company, Canonical Ltd.

In 2005, he founded the Ubuntu Foundation and made an initial investment of 10 million dollars. In the Ubuntu project, Shuttleworth is often referred to with the tongue-in-cheek title "Self-Appointed Benevolent Dictator for Life" (SABDFL). To come up with a list of names of people to hire for the project, Shuttleworth took six months of Debian mailing list archives with him while travelling to Antarctica aboard the icebreaker Kapitan Khlebnikov in early 2004. In September 2005, he purchased a 65% stake of Impi Linux.

On 15 October 2006, it was announced that Mark Shuttleworth had become the first patron of KDE, the highest level of sponsorship available. This relationship ended in 2012, together with financial support for Kubuntu, the Ubuntu variant with KDE as main desktop.

On 17 December 2009, Mark announced that, effective March 2010, he would step down as CEO of Canonical to focus energy on product design, partnership, and customers. Jane Silber, COO at Canonical since 2004, took on the job of CEO at Canonical.

In September 2010, he received an honorary degree from the Open University for this work.

On 9 November 2012, Shuttleworth and Kenneth Rogoff took part in a debate opposite Garry Kasparov and Peter Thiel at the Oxford Union, entitled "The Innovation Enigma".

On 25 October 2013, Shuttleworth and Ubuntu were awarded the Austrian anti-privacy Big Brother Award for sending local Ubuntu Unity Dash searches to Canonical servers by default. A year earlier, in 2012, Shuttleworth had defended the anonymisation method used. He later reversed the decision, and no current Ubuntu version does this.

Spaceflight

Shuttleworth gained worldwide fame on 25 April 2002, as the second self-funded space tourist and the first South African in space. Flying through Space Adventures, he launched aboard the Russian Soyuz TM-34 mission as a spaceflight participant, paying approximately US$20 million for the voyage (equivalent to $ million in ). Two days later, the Soyuz spacecraft arrived at the International Space Station, where he spent eight days participating in experiments related to AIDS and genome research. On 5 May 2002, he returned to Earth on Soyuz TM-33. In order to participate in the flight, Shuttleworth had to undergo one year of training and preparation, including seven months spent in Star City, Russia.

When he was in space, he spoke to Thabo Mbeki, then president of South Africa, on video link as part of the Freedom Day celebrations to mark the end of apartheid.

He also had a radio conversation with Nelson Mandela and a 14-year-old South African girl, Michelle Foster, who asked him to marry her. He politely dodged the question, stating that he was "very honoured at the question" before changing the subject. The terminally ill Foster was provided the opportunity to have a conversation with Mark Shuttleworth and Nelson Mandela by the Reach for a Dream foundation.

Transport
He has a private jet, a Bombardier Global Express, which is often referred to as Canonical One but is in fact owned through his HBD Venture Capital company. The dragon depicted on the side of the plane is Norman, the HBD Venture Capital mascot.

Legal clash with the South African Reserve Bank
Upon moving R2.5 billion in capital from South Africa to the Isle of Man, the South African Reserve Bank imposed a R250 million levy in order to release his assets. Shuttleworth won a case in the Supreme Court of Appeal to have the levy monies returned. However, on 18 June 2015 the Constitutional Court of South Africa reversed and set aside the findings of the lower courts, ruling that the dominant purpose of an exit charge was to regulate conduct rather than to raise revenue. The court held "...that the exit charge was not inconsistent with the Constitution. The dominant purpose of the exit charge was not to raise revenue but rather to regulate conduct by discouraging the export of capital to protect the domestic economy."

Notes

References

External links

 Mark Shuttleworth's homepage
 Spacefacts biography of Mark Shuttleworth

1973 births
Alumni of Diocesan College, Cape Town
British astronauts
British bloggers
British chief executives
British software engineers
Canonical (company)
Cypherpunks
Debian people
Living people
Open source people
People from Welkom
South African astronauts
South African chief executives
South African engineers
South African inventors
South African people of British descent
Space tourists
Ubuntu (operating system) people
University of Cape Town alumni
White South African people